Montmirail may refer to:

Places
 Dentelles de Montmirail, a small chain of mountains in the Vaucluse department, southern France
 Montmirail, Marne, in the Marne department, France
Battle of Montmirail, a battle fought in 1814 during the Six Days' Campaign of the Napoleonic Wars
 , on the list of châteaux in Champagne-Ardenne
 Montmirail, Sarthe, in the Sarthe department, France
 , on the list of châteaux in the Pays-de-la-Loire
 Montmirail, Neuchâtel, a hamlet near Neuchâtel, Switzerland

People
 Cécile de Montmirail (16th century), married to Antoine de La Rochefoucauld
 Jean de Montmirail (1165–1217), French nobleman who became a Cistercian monk
 Guillaume de Montmirail, French nobleman and first mayor of La Rochelle in 1199
 Renaud de Montmirail, French nobleman, member of the Fourth Crusade
 Godefroy de Montmirail, a fictional character in the French film Les Visiteurs